Mexico City, the capital of Mexico, has over 2080 high-rise buildings (as of July 2022). The list below indicates the tallest buildings in the city ranking from highest to lowest based on official heights.

Tallest buildings
This list ranks buildings in Mexico City based on the official height. All the buildings listed below are either completed or topped out and rise at least 150 meters from the ground.

Under Construction

Timeline of tallest buildings of Mexico City

See also 

 List of tallest buildings in Monterrey
 List of tallest buildings in Tijuana
 List of tallest buildings in Mexico
 List of tallest buildings in Latin America
 List of tallest buildings in North America

References

Mexico City
Tallest